Boussé is a department or commune of Kourwéogo Province in central  Burkina Faso. Its capital is the town of Boussé. According to the 2019 census the department has a total population of 58,641.

Towns and villages
 Boussé	(25,027 inhabitants) (capital)
 Gasma	(1,712 inhabitants)
 Goala	(1,006 inhabitants)
 Golmidou	(1,740 inhabitants)
 Goundrin	(1,852 inhabitants)
 Guesna	(1,061 inhabitants)
 Kaonghin	(3,838 inhabitants)
 Kiedpalogo	(1,005 inhabitants)
 Kinana	(1,242 inhabitants)
 Koui	(2,021 inhabitants)
 Kourian	(966 inhabitants)
 Laogo	(717 inhabitants)
 Likinkelsé	(1,196 inhabitants)
 Sandogo	(2,734 inhabitants)
 Sao	(5,369 inhabitants)
 Silmiougou	(708 inhabitants)
 Yargo	(673 inhabitants)

References

Departments of Burkina Faso
Kourwéogo Province

de:Boussé
it:Boussé
vi:Boussé